Harley-Davidson engines are a line of engines manufactured since 1903 in Milwaukee, Wisconsin by the Harley-Davidson company for use in its motorcycles.  Harley-Davidson engines are now made in several locations globally, including York, Pennsylvania; Milwaukee, Wisconsin; Kansas City, Missouri (closing); Manaus, Brazil; and Bawal, India.

The Harley Family started making smaller flathead motorcycle engines individually by hand and fitted to bicycles in the 10 ft x 15 ft wooden barn in Milwaukee that was the Harley-Davidson workshop of the time, prior to that in 1901.

That first engine was a single cylinder model, based roughly on the recently developed De Dion-Bouton internal combustion engine.

The company was soon fully committed to producing its own proprietary engine designs, and by 1909 the first Harley-Davidson V-Twin engine had been designed and made, setting a template for engine design that continues today.

Engine timeline  

Big Twin  (Stock) Engine Sizes: 
 Flathead                   45ci (737cc) 
 Knucklehead                60ci (983cc)   & 74ci (1212cc) 
 Panhead                    60ci (983cc)   & 74ci (1212cc) 
 Shovelhead                 74ci (1212cc)  & 82ci (1343cc) 
 Evolution                  82ci (1343cc) 
 Twincam                    88ci (1442cc)  & 95ci (1556cc) (88/96ci bore 3.75in (95.25mm) & 4.00in stroke on 88ci (101.6 mm) 
 Twincam                    96ci (1584cc)  & 103ci (1690cc)(96/103ci bore 3.875in (98.40mm) & 4.38in stroke on 96ci (111.25 mm) 
 2017-Milwaukee-Eight       107ci (1746cc) & 114ci (1868cc) & 117ci (1923cc)

References

Henshaw, Peter, Kerr, Ian, "The Encyclopedia of the Harley-Davidson", 2001, Chartwell Books, Inc., 
Flatheads, Knuckleheads, Panheads, Shovelheads | A Guide to Harley-Davidson Engines, Devitt Insurance, 2021. 

 Timeline